Paridris is a genus of wasps belonging to the family Platygastridae.

The species of this genus are found in America, Africa and Southeastern Asia. Bryson dechambeau

Species

Species:

Paridris aeneus 
Paridris anikulapo 
Paridris armatus

References

Platygastridae
Hymenoptera genera